Tikipunga is one of the biggest suburbs in Whangārei, New Zealand. It is in the north-east part of the city and has the landmark Whangārei Falls nearby.

Demographics

Tikipunga had a population of 6,906 at the 2018 New Zealand census, an increase of 1,422 people (25.9%) since the 2013 census, and an increase of 1,143 people (19.8%) since the 2006 census. There were 2,433 households, comprising 3,213 males and 3,693 females, giving a sex ratio of 0.87 males per female, with 1,662 people (24.1%) aged under 15 years, 1,296 (18.8%) aged 15 to 29, 2,496 (36.1%) aged 30 to 64, and 1,452 (21.0%) aged 65 or older.

Ethnicities were 69.8% European/Pākehā, 41.8% Māori, 6.3% Pacific peoples, 3.3% Asian, and 1.6% other ethnicities. People may identify with more than one ethnicity.

The percentage of people born overseas was 12.9, compared with 27.1% nationally.

Although some people chose not to answer the census's question about religious affiliation, 48.4% had no religion, 36.9% were Christian, 4.2% had Māori religious beliefs, 0.4% were Hindu, 0.1% were Muslim, 0.6% were Buddhist and 1.2% had other religions.

Of those at least 15 years old, 522 (10.0%) people had a bachelor's or higher degree, and 1,416 (27.0%) people had no formal qualifications. 408 people (7.8%) earned over $70,000 compared to 17.2% nationally. The employment status of those at least 15 was that 2,118 (40.4%) people were employed full-time, 606 (11.6%) were part-time, and 315 (6.0%) were unemployed.

Attractions
The nearby Whangārei Falls have since the 1940s been in public ownership.

Education
Tikipunga High School is a state coeducational Year 7-13 secondary school on Corks Road, with a roll of  students as of  The school opened in 1971.

Tikipunga Primary School is a contributing primary (years 1–6) school with a roll of  students as of 

Te Kura Kaupapa Maori o Te Rawhiti Roa is a composite (years 1–15) school with a roll of  students as of 

All these schools are coeducational.

Amenities 
The Paramount Plaza shopping centre on Paramount Parade serves the suburb and is anchored by a large Countdown Supermarket. It contains a service station, several food outlets, a liquor store, a pharmacy, a video store and a medical centre. Nearby is the Tikipunga branch of the Whangārei Libraries. There is also a smaller suburban shopping strip on the corner of Kiripaka Road and Spedding Road.

Notes

External links
 Tikipunga High School website

Suburbs of Whangārei